Dubravka Kralj (born 1994) is a Serbian politician. She has served in the National Assembly of Serbia since 2020 as a member of the Socialist Party of Serbia (Socijalistička partija Srbije, SPS).

Early life and career
Kralj was born in Zrenjanin, Vojvodina, Republic of Serbia, in what was when the Federal Republic of Yugoslavia. She holds a bachelor's degree (2017) and a master's degree (2019) from the University of Novi Sad Faculty of Law; she graduated with a 9.97 average for her bachelor's – the highest grade in her class – and a ten average for her master's. She interned in Novi Sad and at the time of her election to the national assembly was planning to practise law independently.

Politician

Parliamentarian
Despite having little political experience, Kralj was given the third position on the Socialist Party's electoral list in the 2020 Serbian parliamentary election. This was tantamount to election, and she was indeed elected when the list won thirty-two mandates. During the campaign, she defended the Socialist Party as a genuine party of the left, responding to criticism that it had failed to uphold left-wing values when in power.

The Socialist Party continued its participation in Serbia's coalition government after the election, and Kralj served as part of the government's parliamentary majority. During her first term, she was a member of the committee on constitutional and legislative issues; a deputy member of the committee on the judiciary, public administration, and local self-government; a deputy member of the committee on the economy, regional development, trade, tourism, and energy; a deputy member of the health and family committee; a member of a special commission for the control of the execution of criminal sanctions; a deputy member of the European Union–Serbia stabilization and association committee; the head of Serbia's parliamentary friendship groups with Comoros and Tunisia; and a member of the friendship groups with Egypt, Ethiopia, France, Hungary, Montenegro, Namibia, Russia, Slovenia, the countries of Sub-Saharan Africa, Turkey, the United Kingdom, and the United States of America. In her capacity as leader of the friendship group with Tunisia, she met the Tunisian ambassador to Serbia, Seyf-Allah Rejeb, in April 2021.

She received the fifteenth position on the SPS's list in the 2022 parliamentary election and was elected to a second term when the list won thirty-one mandates. She is now a member of the committee on constitutional and legislative issues; a member of the committee on the judiciary, public administration, and local self-government; and a deputy member of Serbia's delegation to the parliamentary dimension of the Central European Initiative.

Local politics
Kralj received the second position on the Socialist Party's list for the Zrenjanin city assembly in the 2020 Serbian local elections, which were held concurrently with the parliamentary election. She was elected when the list won eleven mandates. As of 2022, she continues to serve in the city assembly.

References

1994 births
Living people
Politicians from Zrenjanin
Members of the National Assembly (Serbia)
Substitute members of the Parliamentary Dimension of the Central European Initiative
Socialist Party of Serbia politicians
Women members of the National Assembly (Serbia)